The Shan Pui River (also known as Yuen Long Creek) is a river in Yuen Long, New Territories, Hong Kong. It has many tributaries, most of them starting from inside Tai Lam Country Park. It passes six villages and is joined by a few more streams. After flowing through Yuen Long Town, it continues northeast into Yuen Long Industrial Estate and Nam Sang Wai. The Kam Tin River flows into it on the way. It eventually empties into the Mai Po Nature Reserve and then Deep Bay.

Crocodile
The river was at the centre of attention in November 2003, when a 1.5 metre-long female crocodile was found in the river near Nam Sang Wai. It attracted many people to the village, all wanting to see the once-in-a-lifetime sight.

Many efforts were made to catch the crocodile, but it wasn't until over six months later, in June 2004, before it was caught. Afterwards, the AFCD and RTHK held a naming contest for the crocodile. On 12August 2004, the crocodile was named Pui Pui (貝貝), a transliteration of the Chinese characters, meaning that it came from the Shan Pui River.

After it was caught, it was housed in Kadoorie Farm. It was moved to Hong Kong Wetland Park in August 2006.

See also
 List of rivers and nullahs in Hong Kong
 Fung Lok Wai

References
This article draws some information from the corresponding article in Chinese Wikipedia.
2006. Hong Kong Driving Guide. Universal Publications Ltd.

External links

Rivers of Hong Kong, in Chinese
Yuen Long crocodile named Pui Pui

Rivers of Hong Kong
Yuen Long